Kunihiko Hidaka from The University of Tokyo, Tokyo, Japan was named Fellow of the Institute of Electrical and Electronics Engineers (IEEE) in 2012 for contributions to measurement and electrical insulation technologies in high voltage engineering.

References

Fellow Members of the IEEE
Living people
Year of birth missing (living people)
Place of birth missing (living people)
Academic staff of the University of Tokyo